The National Conference on Undergraduate Research (NCUR) was established in 1987 at the University of North Carolina at Asheville to promote undergraduate research in universities throughout the United States. Undergraduate students are invited to submit abstracts to present their work at NCUR, which is currently one of the events sponsored by the Council on Undergraduate Research (CUR) umbrella organization.

Mission
The mission of the National Conference on Undergraduate Research (NCUR) is to promote undergraduate research scholarship and creative activity done in partnership with faculty or other mentors as a vital component of higher education.

History of NCUR and Association with CUR 
The National Conference on Undergraduate Research (NCUR) was established at University of North Carolina at Asheville in 1987 with 400 students from campuses countrywide presenting their work. From its inception, NCUR included students from the sciences, the arts, the humanities, and the social sciences.  Students were encouraged to present their work in collaboration with faculty members in a variety of media and formats from posters to performances. NCUR continued and expanded, beginning to move to different campus hosts in 1989. Currently approximately 4000 students participate annually, drawn from all fields and from any college or university. The Council on Undergraduate Research (CUR) was established in 1987 also with a focus on faculty chemistry research at primarily undergraduate institutions that included the students as co-investigators with their faculty mentors.  Over time, CUR welcomed other sciences and then non-sciences and also added an At Large group.  The two organizations co-existed until 2010 when they decided to combine forces.  Currently, the combined organization is called CUR and it sponsors a NCUR each year.

Host campuses
 1987 University of North Carolina at Asheville
 1988 University of North Carolina at Asheville
 1989 Trinity University
 1990 Union College
 1991 California Institute of Technology
 1992 University of Minnesota
 1993 University of Utah
 1994 Western Michigan University
 1995 Union College
 1996 University of North Carolina at Asheville
 1997 University of Texas at Austin
 1998 Salisbury State University
 1999 University of Rochester
 2000 University of Montana-Missoula
 2001 University of Kentucky
 2002 University of Wisconsin–Whitewater
 2003 University of Utah
 2004 Indiana University-Purdue University Indianapolis
 2005 Washington and Lee University and Virginia Military Institute
 2006 University of North Carolina at Asheville
 2007 Dominican University of California
 2008 Salisbury University
 2009 University of Wisconsin–La Crosse
 2010 University of Montana
 2011 Ithaca College
 2012 Weber State University
 2013 University of Wisconsin-La Crosse
 2014 University of Kentucky
 2015 Eastern Washington University
 2016 University of North Carolina at Asheville
 2017 University of Memphis
 2018 University of Central Oklahoma
 2019 Kennesaw State University
 2020 Montana State University (cancelled due to coronavirus concerns)

References

External links
 Official website

Education in the United States
Science and technology in the United States
Undergraduate education in the United States